Caroline Jane Barrs (born 8 July 1964) is an English former cricketer who played as an all-rounder. She was a left-handed batter and slow left-arm orthodox bowler. She appeared in 10 One Day Internationals for England, making her debut against Australia in the 1988 Women's Cricket World Cup. Overall, she took 17 wickets at an average of 9.52, with a best of four for 23. With the bat, she scored 104 runs with a high score of 36. She played domestic cricket for Kent and Surrey. She has played club cricket for Orpington Nomads and Brighton and Hove.

References

External links
 
 

1964 births
Living people
People from Croydon
England women One Day International cricketers
Kent women cricketers
Surrey women cricketers